Renmin Road Subdistrict  is a subdistrict situated in Dawukou District, Wujiaqu, Xinjiang, China. , it administers the following seven residential neighborhoods:
Qinghunan Road Community
Dongcheng Community
Longquan Community
Beihaidong Street Community

See also
List of township-level divisions of Xinjiang

References

Township-level divisions of Xinjiang
Wujiaqu
Subdistricts of the People's Republic of China